The 2015 season was the 110th season of competitive football in Norway.

The season began in March, and ended on 22 November with the men's 2015 Norwegian Football Cup Final.

Men's football

Promotion and relegation

Teams promoted to Tippeligaen
 Sandefjord
 Tromsø
 Mjøndalen

Teams relegated from Tippeligaen
 SK Brann
 Sogndal
 Sandnes Ulf

League season

Eliteserien

1. divisjon

2. divisjon

Group 1

Group 2

Group 3

Group 4

3. divisjon

Norwegian Cup

Final

Women's football

Promotion and relegation
Teams promoted to Toppserien
 Urædd

Teams relegated from Toppserien
 Sandviken

League season

Toppserien

1. divisjon

Norwegian Women's Cup

Final
Avaldsnes 2–3 LSK Kvinner

National teams

Norway men's national football team

UEFA Euro 2016 qualifying

Group A

Play-offs

Norway women's national football team

References

 
Seasons in Norwegian football